The NXT UK Heritage Cup is a professional wrestling championship created and promoted by the American promotion WWE. It was defended on the NXT UK brand division, a sister brand of WWE's developmental territory NXT based in the United Kingdom, but its current status is unknown. Unveiled on 10 September 2020, it is defended just like any other championship but has a special stipulation in which all matches are contested under British Rounds Rules. The inaugural champion was A-Kid.

At Worlds Collide on 4 September 2022, all other NXT UK championships were unified into their respective NXT championship counterparts due to the closure of NXT UK, which will relaunch as NXT Europe in 2023. The Heritage Cup, however, was not contested at the event and there has been no announcement regarding its future, but WWE's website still lists it as active with Noam Dar as the current champion in his record-setting second reign. The last match for the title occurred during the 7 July 2022 tapings of NXT UK, which aired on tape delay on 25 August 2022.

History
On 10 September 2020, the American professional wrestling promotion WWE announced the relaunch of the NXT UK brand, following a production hiatus since March due to the COVID-19 pandemic. Along with the relaunch, the promotion announced the NXT UK Heritage Cup tournament to crown the inaugural NXT UK Heritage Cup Champion. The announcement also revealed that the Heritage Cup would be defended just like any other championship, but all matches would be contested under British Rounds Rules.

Only seven of the eight competitors for the tournament were revealed during the initial announcement: "Flash" Morgan Webster, Noam Dar, Alexander Wolfe, A-Kid, Dave Mastiff, Trent Seven, and Joseph Conners. The eighth competitor was determined on the 1 October episode of NXT UK in a triple threat match in which Kenny Williams defeated Ashton Smith and Amir Jordan to win the final spot. The tournament itself also began on 1 October and took place across episodes of NXT UK. The final aired on tape delay on 26 November where A-Kid defeated Seven to become the inaugural champion (the date the episode was taped is unknown).

Unlike other championships in WWE (and professional wrestling in general), the NXT UK Heritage Cup is represented by a trophy instead of a title belt. The trophy itself is a silver cup with a golden plaque that has a vertical NXT logo and below it the text "Heritage Cup". The cup sits atop a physical representation of the NXT UK logo with a banner below it that also says "Heritage Cup". Circling the wooden base are name plaques to notate the current and previous champions.

In August 2022, WWE announced that NXT UK would go on hiatus after the Worlds Collide event on 4 September 2022 and the brand would relaunch as NXT Europe in 2023. At Worlds Collide, all other NXT UK championships were retired as they were unified into their respective NXT championship counterparts. The Heritage Cup was the only title from either brand to not be contested at the event. There has been no announcement regarding the championship's future, but WWE's website still shows that it is active. The last match for the title occurred during the 7 July 2022 tapings of NXT UK, which aired on tape delay on 25 August, where Noam Dar became a record two-time Heritage Cup Champion.

British Rounds Rules
Matches consist of six three-minute rounds with 20-second breaks between each round.
Matches are 2-out-of-3 falls.
Falls can be won by pinfall, submission, or countout.
Once a fall occurs, the round ends.
The match ends once a wrestler has won two falls.
In the event of a disqualification or knockout, the match instantly ends without the need for two falls.
If all six rounds are completed, whoever is ahead on falls wins the match.

Inaugural tournament

2021 Contender tournament

Reigns
Note: Unless there is a change in rules, all matches are contested under British Rounds Rules.

Combined reigns

Notes

References

External links 
 Official NXT UK Heritage Cup Title History

WWE NXT championships
National professional wrestling championships
Championship